Year 1089 (MLXXXIX) was a common year starting on Monday (link will display the full calendar) of the Julian calendar.

Events 
 By place 

 Europe 
 King Demetrius Zvonimir of Croatia dies after a 12-year reign, and is succeeded by Stephen II. Zvonimir's widow, Queen Helena, plots the inheritance of the Croatian crown for her brother, King Ladislaus I of Hungary.
 June 24 – Viscount Gaston IV of Béarn (supported by French crusaders) reconquers the Aragonese city of Monzón, from Emir Al-Mustain II of the Taifa of Zaragoza.
 August 18 – Emperor Henry IV marries Eupraxia (daughter of Grand Prince Vsevolod I) at Cologne. She is crowned and assumes the name Adelaide (or Adelheid).
 King George II abdicates the throne in favour of his 16-year-old son David IV (the Builder) who becomes ruler of Georgia (until 1125).

 England 
 Northumbria is divided by King William II into the counties of Northumberland, County Palatine of Durham, Yorkshire, Westmorland and Lancashire.
 August 11 – A powerful earthquake is recorded in England.

 By topic 

 Religion 
 March 21 – Cîteaux Abbey, the first Cistercian monastery, is established by a group of French monks under Robert of Molesme in southern France.
 September – The Synod of Melfi, led by Pope Urban II (his first papal council), issues decrees against simony and clerical marriage.
 September – A church council, held in Constantinople, discuses relations between Eastern and Western Christianity.

Births 
 Abraham ibn Ezra, Jewish rabbi and philosopher (d. 1167)
 Berthold of Zwiefalten, German abbot and writer (d. 1169)
 Dahui Zonggao, Chinese Zen Buddhist monk (d. 1163)
 Han Shizhong, Chinese general (Song Dynasty) (d. 1151)
 Mahsati, Persian female poet and writer (approximate date)
 Richard de Luci, Norman High Sheriff of Essex (d. 1179)
 Sigurd I (the Crusader), king of Norway (d. 1130)
 Wulgrin II, count of Angoulême (approximate date)

Deaths 
 May 24 – Lanfranc, archbishop of Canterbury
 May 29/30 – Mah-i Mulk Khatun wife of caliph al-Muqtadi (r. 1075–1094).
 May 31 – Sigwin of Are, archbishop of Cologne
 October 6 – Adalbero, bishop of Würzburg
 November 11 – Peter Igneus, Italian cardinal-bishop
 December 22 – William the Walloon, French abbot
 Agnes of Aquitaine, Italian countess of Savoy
 Demetrius Zvonimir, king of Croatia and Dalmatia
 Donnchad mac Domnaill Remair, king of Dublin 
 Durandus of Troarn, French monk and theologian
 Isaac ibn Ghiyyat, Jewish rabbi and philosopher 
 Mieszko Bolesławowic, Polish prince of Kraków
 Renauld II, French count of Nevers and Auxerre
 Theobold III (or Thibaut), French nobleman

References